The 2023 NISA season is the fifth season of the National Independent Soccer Association's third-division soccer competition. Michigan Stars are the defending champions, after winning the 2022 season.

Teams
Of the eight teams that finished the 2022 season, five return for 2023, two (Flower City Union and Syracuse Pulse) merge to form a new team branded City Union, and one, California United Strikers, is on hiatus, with the aim to return in 2024. 

The six teams are joined by three expansion clubs: Club de Lyon FC, Gold Star FC and Savannah Clovers FC.

Stadiums and locations

Personnel and sponsorship
''Note: The league has signed a deal with Hummel to be the official kit manufacturer, but it still allows clubs to find their own provider.

Coaching changes

Regular season
The season starts on March 31, with the nine teams playing an unbalanced schedule weighted on regional play.

Standings

Results

Playoffs
The playoffs will keep the same format from last year, and feature the top six teams from the regular season. The top two teams receive a bye into the semifinals. Teams finishing third through sixth play in the quarterfinals, with the winners being re-seeded before playing in the next round.

See also 
 National Independent Soccer Association

Notes

References

External links 
 NISA official website

2023
2023 in American soccer leagues